Skopo may refer to:

 Skopo (food), an African dish of meat made from cow, goat, or sheep's head
 Skopo, Sežana, a village in Slovenia